Pécel is a town in Pest county, Budapest metropolitan area, Hungary.

Notable people
Gedeon Ráday, soldier and politician, Minister of Defence
István Sárközi, footballer

Twin towns – sister cities

Pécel is twinned with:
 Mistelbach, Austria
 Iisalmi, Finland

Gallery

References

External links
Official website
Street map 
Pécel News
Aerial photographs of Pécel

Populated places in Pest County